The 1973 Grand Prix motorcycle racing season was the 25th F.I.M. Road Racing World Championship season.

Season summary
MV Agusta teammates Phil Read and Giacomo Agostini battled it out for supremacy of the 500cc class but the season was overshadowed by the deaths of Jarno Saarinen and Renzo Pasolini at the Italian round at Monza. The 500cc title runner-up, Kim Newcombe, also died at a non-championship race at Silverstone late in the year. Agostini claimed his 13th championship in the 350cc class. In the 250cc class, West German Dieter Braun won the crown for Yamaha. Kent Andersson gave Yamaha another title in the 125cc class while Kreidler dominated the 50cc class after the Derbi factory pulled out of racing with Dutchman Jan de Vries taking the crown.

1973 Grand Prix season calendar

Footnotes

Final standings

1973 500 cc Roadracing World Championship final standings

1973 350 cc Roadracing World Championship final standings

1973 250 cc Roadracing World Championship final standings

1973 125 cc Roadracing World Championship final standings

1973 50 cc Roadracing World Championship final standings

References

 Büla, Maurice & Schertenleib, Jean-Claude (2001). Continental Circus 1949-2000. Chronosports S.A. 

Grand Prix motorcycle racing seasons